XHEDO-FM is a radio station on 94.1 FM in Puerto Escondido, Oaxaca, Mexico, carrying the La Mejor grupera format from MVS Radio.

History
XHEDO received its concession on July 10, 1992.

References

Radio stations in Oaxaca